Xoanodera amoena is a species of longhorn beetle endemic to Sri Lanka.

References

External links
 Images of Xoanodera amoena

Cerambycinae
Insects of Sri Lanka
Insects described in 1885